Kudva or Yadunagar is a village in Sadat block, Ghazipur district in Uttar Pradesh. This village is settlemented in 1835 during long time famine in northern India because there was a very big pond in this area named 'Kud pond'. It belongs to Varanasi division.

History
At the time of war between Skandagupta (a Abhir king of Gupt dynasty) and Huns, this place was the cantonment of Skandagupta's army. Skandagupta's army had also made a temporary construction at this place in 455–456, the remains of which remained till 1970 in the form of a huge wall about three kilometers long, which was from north to south direction from the heart of the present Kudva village. Gradually people destroyed that wall and occupied its land. Even today, fragments of bricks of that wall are found at the time of digging deep in people's fields and lands and pieces of pottery are often found in the fields falling on the northern side of Kudva village. A part of that construction is still safe in the form of a huge well which is right in front of Rajdev Yadav's house. The diameter of this well is about 5 meters. The huge pond of this village is also man-made, which never dries up. There is no doubt that this pond may have been constructed at the same time. For many centuries, this place was hidden in the forests and people again noticed it in 1835. From 1803 onwards, there was a drought in North India almost every second or third year. During the long famine of 1835, when all the ponds and wells dried up, three brothers of the Abhir caste (descendants of gupt kingdome) with the help of their domesticated elephants and horses, discovered a huge and deep pond of about 2500 square meters at this place, in spite of the severe famine. There was no effect and was completely filled with water. This huge pond was surrounded by forests on all sides. Those three brothers named that huge pond 'Kund' and settled at this place. Due to the name 'Kund', this place was later named Kudva. Later, due to the descendants of Maharaja Yadu settling here, people started calling this place as Yadunagar also.

Education
One government primary school, one government junior school, three high schools, two Intermediate Colleges (Shree Arjun Yadav Inter College and Shree Jokhan Janta Inter College) and two degree colleges are in this village.
Total Literacy Rate%= 59.9%

Administration
Mr. Manoj Yadav is Gram Pradhan of Ikara (Kudva) now. Mr. Jammu Yadav is BDC of this village.

Nearby Villages
Makhadumpur
Baragaon 
Kauda
Gaura
Devapar 
Satuhari 
Kaithwaliya 
Katyan

Transport
Railway Station- Mahpur, Sadat, Aurihar 
Bus Stop- GreenLand bus stop, Makhadumpur bus stop

Healthcare
One healthcare dispensary is in this village.

Notable People
Late. Ram Kishun Yadav (Sant, Poet and Folk Singer) 
Girija Shankar Yadav (Retd. Teacher),
Sheepat Singh Yadav (Former Gram Pradhan), 
Manohar Singh Yadav (High School UP Board Topper, IITian and former Deputy Commissioner)
Late. Ram Awadh Yadav (Former Gram Pradhan),
Prem Shankar Yadav (Lecturer),
Omprakash Singh Yadav (Principal), 
Rajdev Yadav (Retd. Subedaar Major) 
Bhikhkhu Singh Yadav (Former Gram Pradhan),
Manoj Yadav (Gram Pradhan),
Janardan Yadav (Socialist Leader),
Panna Singh Yadav (Retd. Sub Inspector), 
Ravindra Kumar Yadav (Loco Pilot), 
Kamala Prasad,
Yogendra Yadav(Army),
Sudama Singh Yadav (Socialist Leader)
Harikesh Yadav (Socialist Leader) 
Rahul Yadav (Army) 
Brijesh Singh Yadav(Army)
Suraj Yadav (JRF and Research fellow) 
Jagdish Yadav 
Rama Singh Yadav 
Haricharan Yadav
Sarkaar Singh Yadav (Socialist Leader) 
Vinod Singh Yadav
Mrs. Archana Yadav (Educationist)
Ajeet Yadav
Kamlesh Yadav(Poet)
Dharmendra Yadav (Folk Singer)

References
http://aygirlscollege.org.in/aboutus.html
https://m.jagran.com/uttar-pradesh/ghazipur-9884899.html

Villages in Ghazipur district